Raffles Istanbul is a 5-star hotel in Istanbul that is managed by Raffles Hotels & Resorts. The hotel opened on September 1, 2014. Designed by Emre Arolat & Tabanlıoğlu Architecture, the hotel has a height of 134 meters, making it one of Istanbul’s most noticeable buildings.

History
In 2007, the Zorlu Center project started with the purchase of the property. After several years of construction, Raffles Istanbul was opened on September 1, 2014. The hotel is part of the Zorlu Center which consists of residences, offices, a shopping mall, and a performing arts center. The hotel itself hosts an art collection of around 200 pieces from both international and local artists. The hotel also includes a ballroom with a capacity of 1,200 people and is directly linked to the Performing Arts Center.

Restaurants
Raffles Istanbul has 8 food and beverage outlets.

Recreational facilities
Raffles Istanbul has an array of recreational facilities:

 One of Istanbul's largest spas which is 3000 square metres  
 3 Turkish Hamams / Turkish Bath
 Indoor & Outdoor pool

See also
 Hotels in Istanbul

References

Hotels in Istanbul
Istanbul
Hotels established in 2014
Turkish companies established in 2014